Amherst is a census-designated place (CDP) and the main village in the town of Amherst in Hillsborough County, New Hampshire, United States. The population of the CDP was 697 at the 2020 census, out of 11,753 in the entire town. The village center is listed on the National Register of Historic Places as the Amherst Village Historic District.

Geography
The CDP is in the central part of the town of Amherst, bordered to the east by New Hampshire Route 101; to the south by Thornton Ferry Road, Courthouse Road, and Atherton Lane; to the west by Old Milford Road and the west edge of Meadow View Cemetery; and to the north by Jones Road, Mack Hill Road, and Manchester Road.

Route 101 leads northeast  to the start of the Manchester bypass, and southwest  to Wilton.

Demographics

As of the census of 2010, there were 613 people, 241 households, and 186 families residing in the CDP. There were 254 housing units, of which 13, or 5.1%, were vacant. The racial makeup of the CDP was 99.0% white, 0.0% African American, 0.0% Native American, 0.7% Asian, 0.0% Pacific Islander, 0.0% some other race, and 0.3% from two or more races. 0.8% of the population were Hispanic or Latino of any race.

Of the 241 households in the CDP, 38.2% had children under the age of 18 living with them, 65.1% were headed by married couples living together, 9.5% had a female householder with no husband present, and 22.8% were non-families. 19.9% of all households were made up of individuals, and 12.0% were someone living alone who was 65 years of age or older. The average household size was 2.54, and the average family size was 2.94.

27.1% of residents in the CDP were under the age of 18, 3.9% were from age 18 to 24, 18.0% were from 25 to 44, 31.2% were from 45 to 64, and 19.9% were 65 years of age or older. The median age was 45.6 years. For every 100 females, there were 88.6 males. For every 100 females age 18 and over, there were 89.4 males.

For the period 2011–15, the estimated median annual income for a household was $112,344, and the median income for a family was $141,382.  The per capita income for the CDP was $63,381. 4.3% of the population and 0.0% of families were below the poverty line, along with 0.0% of people under the age of 18 and 0.0% of people 65 or older.

References

Census-designated places in New Hampshire
Census-designated places in Hillsborough County, New Hampshire